Inape is a genus of moths belonging to the family Tortricidae.

Species
Inape arcuata Razowski & Wojtusiak, 2010
Inape asymmetra  Razowski & Pelz, 2006
Inape auxoplaca  (Meyrick, 1926) 
Inape balzapamba Razowski & Wojtusiak, 2008
Inape bicornis  Razowski, 1999
Inape biremis  (Meyrick, 1926) 
Inape cateres  Razowski & Pelz, 2006
Inape celypha  Razowski & Pelz, 2006
Inape centrota  Brown & Razowski, 2003
Inape chara Razowski & Wojtusiak, 2008
Inape cinnamobrunnea  Razowski & Pelz, 2006
Inape circumsetae  Brown & Razowski, 2003
Inape clarkeana  Brown & Razowski, 2003
Inape commoda  Razowski & Pelz, 2006
Inape elegans  Razowski & Pelz, 2006
Inape eltabloana Razowski & Wojtusiak, 2009
Inape eparmuncus  Razowski & Pelz, 2006
Inape epiphanes  Razowski & Pelz, 2006
Inape extraria  Razowski & Pelz, 2006
Inape geoda  Razowski & Pelz, 2006
Inape homeotypa  Razowski & Pelz, 2006
Inape homologa  Razowski & Pelz, 2006
Inape homora  Razowski & Pelz, 2006
Inape iantha  (Meyrick, 1912) 
Inape incarnata  Razowski & Pelz, 2006
Inape intermedia Razowski & Wojtusiak, 2010
Inape laterosclera  Razowski & Pelz, 2006
Inape lojae Razowski & Wojtusiak, 2008
Inape luteina  Razowski & Pelz, 2006
Inape papallactana  Razowski, 1999
Inape parastella Razowski & Wojtusiak, 2009
Inape parelegans Razowski & Wojtusiak, 2009
Inape penai  Razowski, 1988
Inape polysparta  Razowski & Pelz, 2006
Inape pompata  Razowski & Pelz, 2006
Inape porpax  Razowski & Pelz, 2006
Inape pseudocelypha  Razowski & Pelz, 2006
Inape reductana  Brown & Razowski, 2003
Inape rigidsocia Razowski & Wojtusiak, 2008
Inape saetiphora Razowski & Wojtusiak, 2010
Inape semuncus  Razowski, 1997
Inape sinuata  Brown & Razowski, 2003
Inape sororia  Razowski & Pelz, 2006
Inape stella Razowski & Wojtusiak, 2009
Inape toledana Razowski & Wojtusiak, 2008
Inape tricornuta Razowski & Wojtusiak, 2008
Inape uncina  Razowski & Pelz, 2006
Inape xerophanes  (Meyrick, 1909)

References

 , 2005, World Catalogue of Insects 5
 , 2003: Review of Inape Razowski (Lepidoptera: Tortricidae: Euliini), with descriptions of five new species. Acta Zoologica Cracoviensia 46 (3): 197–208. Full article:  .
 , 1988, Acta Zoologica Cracoviensia 31: 394
 , 2009: Tortricidae (Lepidoptera) from the mountains of Ecuador and remarks on their geographical distribution. Part IV. Eastern Cordillera. Acta Zoologica Cracoviensia 51B (1-2): 119–187. doi:10.3409/azc.52b_1-2.119–187. Full article:  .
 , 2010: Tortricidae (Lepidoptera) from Peru. Acta Zoologica Cracoviensia 53B (1-2): 73-159. . Full article:  .

External links

tortricidae.com

 
Euliini
Tortricidae genera
Taxa named by Józef Razowski